Salm Alzwaher (also known as Salm Al-Zawher) is a village in the Emirate of Makkah in Saudi Arabia.  It is located in the Laith Governorate. The village includes a masjid and train station is located in the village.

References 

Populated places in Mecca Province